Moses van Uyttenbroeck, or Moyses van Wtenbrouck was a Dutch Golden Age painter and etcher.

Biography
Van Uyttenbroeck was born and died in The Hague.  According to the RKD he was the younger brother of the painter Jan Matheus van Wtenbrouck, and later became the teacher of the painters Anthonie Jansz. van der Croos and perhaps Dirk Dalens the Elder, since their styles were so similar.
Van Uyttenbroeck primarily painted works based on religious and classical mythology themes.  He was a versatile court painter who painted portraits and Italianate landscapes in the manner of Cornelis van Poelenburch. He joined the Guild of Saint Luke in 1614. Van Uyttenbroeck died in 1646.

References

Moyses van Wtenbrouck on Artnet

1600s births
1646 deaths
Dutch Golden Age painters
Dutch male painters
Artists from The Hague
Painters from The Hague
Court painters